Vijay Patrel may refer to:

Vijay Patel (businessman), Indian-English businessman
Vijay Patel (politician) (born 1960), Indian lawyer and politician